The Dhanbad–Patna Intercity Express is an Express train belonging to East Central Railway zone that runs between  and  in India. It is currently being operated with 13331/13332 train numbers on a daily basis.

Service

The 13331/Dhanbad–Patna InterCity Express has an average speed of 41 km/h and covers 370 km in 9h. The 13332/Patna–Dhanbad InterCity Express has an average speed of 47 km/hr and covers 370 km in 7h 55m.

Route and halts 

The important halts of the train are:

Coach composition

The train has standard ICF rakes with max speed of 110 km/h. The train consists of 24 coaches:

 1 AC First cum II Tier
 2 AC II Tier
 4 AC III Tier
 9 Sleeper coaches
 6 General
 2 Seating cum Luggage Rake

Traction

Both trains are hauled by Gomoh Loco Shed-based WAP-7 or Din Dayal Upadhyay Loco Shed-based WAP-4 electric locomotive from Patna to Dhanbad and vice versa.

Rake sharing

The train shares its rake with 1332/13330 Ganga Damodar Express

See also 

 Rajendra Nagar Terminal railway station
 Dhanbad Junction railway station
 South Bihar Express
 Ganga Damodar Express

Notes

External links 

 13331/Dhanbad-Patna InterCity Express
 13332/Patna-Dhanbad InterCity Express

References 

Transport in Patna
Transport in Dhanbad
Intercity Express (Indian Railways) trains
Rail transport in Jharkhand
Rail transport in Bihar
Rail transport in West Bengal